The Stachybotryaceae are a family of fungi in the order Hypocreales; the genera it contains have been described as "hyper-diverse". The family was updated in 2020.

Genera
As accepted in 2020 (with amount of species);

Note; for Stachybotrys , 12 species have been phylogenetically studied although 81 epithets remain be studied.

References

External links
 
 

 
Ascomycota families
Hypocreales